Jonas Ivens (born 14 October 1984 in Beveren) is a retired Belgian footballer who played as a centre back. He is currently the assistant manager of AS Monaco.

He made a name of himself in his homeland Belgium, before moving to Dutch football in the summer of 2010 after signing with Groningen.

Career

Belgium
Ivens broke through to the first team of hometown club KSK Beveren in the 2003–04 season. He played one season for the club, in a period in which Jean-Marc Guillou guided Beveren to a more attractive financial situation through talented Ivorian players. This meant a limited opportunity for Ivens to play in the first team, which resulted in moving to second division side KMSK Deinze in 2004. There he played two seasons, before being signed by K.V. Mechelen in the spring of 2006. With Mechelen he promoted to the Belgian Pro League, and became captain of the team.

FC Groningen
On 16 June 2010, Ivens signed a four-year contract with Groningen. Groningen paid a €500,000 fee for the player. He made his first-team debut in a 2–2 Eredivisie draw against Ajax on 8 August 2010.

Coaching career
After retiring at the end of the 2015–16 season, Ivens was hired as a physical coach at Waasland-Beveren. In the summer 2018, he took charge of the club's reserve and would, next to that, also function as an assistant manager for the first team.

In the summer 2019, he was appointed assistant manager of Club Brugge KV under manager Philippe Clement. On 3 January 2022, Ivens moved to AS Monaco together with Clement.

References
General
Guardian Football

Specific

External links
 
 Voetbal International profile 

1984 births
Living people
Belgian footballers
Belgian football managers
Belgian expatriate footballers
K.S.K. Beveren players
K.V. Mechelen players
FC Groningen players
RKC Waalwijk players
Belgian Pro League players
Challenger Pro League players
Eredivisie players
Expatriate footballers in the Netherlands
Association football central defenders
S.K. Beveren players
K.M.S.K. Deinze players
Cercle Brugge K.S.V. players
Association football defenders
Club Brugge KV non-playing staff
AS Monaco FC non-playing staff
People from Beveren
Footballers from East Flanders